Howard Carter (1874–1939) was an English archaeologist who discovered Tutankhamun's tomb.

Howard Carter may also refer to:

 Howard Carter (basketball) (born 1961), American basketball player
 Howard Carter (businessman), founder of Incognito cosmetic brand
 Howard Carter (evangelist) (died 1992), New Zealand-US religious leader
 Howard Carter (Pentecostal pioneer) (1891–1971), American Pentecostal Christian pioneer

See also
 Howie Carter (1904–1991), American baseball player